Reindeerspotting: Escape from Santaland is a Finnish documentary film about drug abusers in Rovaniemi, Finland. It was directed by Joonas Neuvonen and produced by Jesse Fryckman and Oskari Huttu. The first screening of the film was in Tampere, April 2010, Finland.

The name of the movie is a direct allusion to the 1996 British drama film Trainspotting that treated the same theme from a Scottish point of view.

The film was shown outside of Finland for the first time in Locarno International Film Festival in Switzerland.

Synopsis 
The documentary follows several young drug abusers, but focuses on Jani Raappana. Jani is a drug addict, whose drug of choice is Subutex taken intravenously. He is unemployed and he finances his addiction through thefts, burglaries, and welfare payments. He deems carjacking and theft of radios as something he "specialises in", and uses it as a way to get fast money. Some of the main problems he faces is conflicts with fellow drug users, and losing two fingers in an accident. Due to the shortage of Subutex in the city, Jani starts to experience withdrawal symptoms, and suffers from the lack of substances available.

After a failed burglary attempt, Jani is arrested and released after three days. The court seeks to imprison Jani for various offences, such as DUI and theft for at least a year, but sees prison as nothing special, just free food and accommodation. As his prison sentence draws near, his debt increases due to his prolonged drug use. However, he manages to steal 5000 euros from a grocery store and decides to flee Finland.

Jani goes around various cities in Europe, such as Paris, London and Rome, lamenting about how free he is from Rovaniemi. However, the dealers threaten to demolish his flat and he finds himself in debt again. After running out of money, Jani returns home and is arrested two weeks later, and the film states he spent time in and out of prison for "years". The film ends with him picturing himself living an ideal life, with a cottage and a wife.

Other 
The main character in the movie, Jani Raappana, travelled in May 2010 with Neuvonen, the director of the movie, to Cambodia. Raappana died in Phnom Penh on 7 July 2010. According to the local media, Raappana hanged himself.

In January 2013, the director of the film, Joonas Neuvonen, was sentenced to two-and-a-half years in prison for drug crimes.

In August 2020, a sequel to the film, also directed by Neuvonen titled 'Lost Boys' was released on 25 September 2020. The film details the aftermath of the premiere of Reindeerspotting and the death of Raappana in Cambodia.

References

External links 
 

2010 films
2010s Finnish-language films
Documentary films about drug addiction
Finnish documentary films
2010 documentary films